Abba Estifanos or Ǝsṭifanos (English Translation: Father Stephen) was an Ethiopian Christian monk from Tigray, itinerant preacher and martyr who is known for his reformation movement and as an early dissident of the Ethiopian Orthodox Church and Emperor Zara Ya'iqob in the 15th century. His followers were known as Stephanites and were known for their strict ascetical observances of the Bible and early Christian fathers, soli Deo gloria veneration to God alone and not to religious icons and saints. Over the course of a century of persecution by clergy and five consecutive kings following Zara Ya'iqob, membership in the Stephanites movement dwindled and vanished.

Early life and monasticism

Reformation

Growth and persecution
There is a legend which suggests that the Ethiopian Orthodox Tewahedo Church started the tradition of making the sign of the cross whenever one goes past a church in an attempt to distinguish Stephanites from among them for persecution.

Death

Stephanites

Theology
Due to the burning of Estifanos' literature and books, we do not have the full volume of his teachings. The book The Ge'ez Acts of Abba Estifanos of Gwendagwende is one of the few surviving books from that era describing in detail the teachings and practices of Estifanos and the Stephanites.

Fate of the Estifanotites
According to the Chronicle of Zara Ya'iqob, since the Stephanites refused to bow to the Cross of Jesus and the Virgin Mary, the Theotokos, the king had their noses and ears cut off and stoned them. Thirty-eight days after their stoning, the 10th of Magabit, the day of the feast of the Cross, a light appeared in the sky and remained visible in all the land for several days, which caused the King to take a fancy to this locality which he named Dabra Berhan.

Legacy
Although the Ethiopian Orthodox Tewahedo Church claims that Estifanos was a heretic, he is revered as a saint and a martyr by most Ethiopian Evangelicals, who also view him as the original leader of their movement and have admired him and his teachings in a number of books. There has also been an academic interest in his life and that of his followers in recent years. Some have called him "the first African Protestant" due to his teachings, but in the end his enduring legacy is as the person who started a reform movement over seventy years before the Protestant Reformation.

References 
 Mesfin Shuge, "Biography of 'Hadege Anbesa' (Abba Stephanos) of the Orthodox Church," term paper, Ethiopian Graduate School of Theology (EGST), Addis Ababa (May 2001).
 Steven Kaplan, Monastic Holy Man and the Christianization of Early Solomonic Ethiopia (Wiesbaden: Franz Steiner, 1984), pp. 41–44.
 Dr. Dirshaye Menberu, "Abba Estifanos (Hadege Anbesa)" Dictionary of African Christian Biography, http://www.dacb.org/stories/ethiopia/estifanos_.html (2005)
 Dr. Getatchew Haile (translator), The Ge'ez Acts of Abba Estifanos of Gwendagwende (2006)

Ethiopian Christians
1380s births
1450s deaths
Ethiopian Orthodox Christians
15th-century Ethiopian people
15th-century Christian martyrs